Parliamentary elections were held in Bulgaria on 29 May 1927. The result was a victory for the Democratic Alliance–National Liberal Party alliance, which won 174 of the 261 seats. Voter turnout was 84.3%. A special election law guaranteed the party which gained the largest share of the vote an absolute majority in the assembly.

Results

Votes

Seats

References

Bulgaria
Parliamentary elections in Bulgaria
Bulgaria
Election and referendum articles with incomplete results
Parliamentary